Alejandro Maximino was an Argentinian actor. His last film was the 1962 film Una Jaula no tiene secretos.

Selected filmography
Madame Bovary (1947)

References

External links
 
 

Argentine male film actors
Year of birth missing
Year of death missing